The Arabian Kingdom's General Staff Presidency is the general command of the Armed Forces of the Kingdom of Saudi Arabia, organized under the Ministry Of Defense. Its headquarters is located in Riyadh.

Organization

Current members

See also
 Chairman of the General Staff

External links

 MoD  (official website)
 Moqatel Warrior Desert

References

 
Saudi
Military units and formations established in 1901
 
Joint military headquarters